Wilson v Racher [1974] ICR 428 is a UK labour law case concerning constructive dismissal. It serves as an example of an employer being found to have wrongfully dismissed an employee, because of the employer's own bad behaviour. Edmund-Davies LJ also made an important statement about the modern employment relationship,

Facts
Mr Wilson, a "man of considerable competence" was the head gardener of an  estate at Tolethorpe Hall, Little Casterton, Stamford. He was employed by Mr Racher. He was employed for a fixed period of six months and his contract said this.

“Your employment will commence on April 24, 1972, and shall continue thereafter unless and until terminated by either of us by notice in writing expiring on October 23, 1972, or any anniversary of that date.”

When the two men first met there was "a complete conflict of personalities" and Mr Racher sacked Mr Wilson on June 11. Mr Wilson claimed this was wrongful dismissal. Mr Racher claimed the dismissal was for incompetence and misconduct, though the former allegation was dropped during trial. The question was whether the dismissal - i.e. termination of the contract - on grounds of misconduct was wrongful.

Judgment
Edmund Davies LJ, with whom Cairns LJ and James LJ concurred, held that in fact it was Mr Racher responsible for the breakdown of the employment relationship and that he had dismissed Mr Wilson unfairly.

Cairns LJ

James LJ

See also

UK labour law

Notes

References
King v University of St Andrews [2005] CSIH 43
E McGaughey, A Casebook on Labour Law (Hart 2019) ch 4, 178

United Kingdom labour case law
Court of Appeal (England and Wales) cases
1974 in case law
1974 in British law
United Kingdom employment contract case law